Malte Meineche Amundsen (born 11 February 1998) is a Danish professional footballer who plays as a defender for New York City FC of Major League Soccer.

Club career
Born in Næstved, Amundsen started his youth career with hometown club Næstved Boldklub, before moving to the HB Køge youth academy in January 2013. He made his debut in the Danish Cup on 23 September 2015 against AC Horsens. A few months later, 29 November 2015, he made his league debut coming on against FC Vestsjælland.

Amundsen signed for Rosenborg in January 2018.

On 20 April 2018, he made his debut for Rosenborg playing the full game against Trygg/Lade in a Cup game which Rosenborg won 4–2. A week later, he started against Lillestrøm in the 2018 Mesterfinalen and helped secure a 1–0 victory.

15 January 2019, Amundsen returned to Denmark, signing a three-and-a-half-year contract with Vejle Boldklub.

On 10 February 2021, it was announced that Vejle and New York City FC of the Major League Soccer had successfully negotiated a transfer of Amundsen for a fee of DKK ten million. New York City announced the transfer on 12 February 2021.

Career statistics

Club

Honours
Rosenborg
Mesterfinalen: 2018

New York City FC
MLS Cup: 2021
Campeones Cup: 2022

References

External links

1998 births
Living people
Danish men's footballers
Denmark youth international footballers
Association football defenders
HB Køge players
Rosenborg BK players
Vejle Boldklub players
Eintracht Braunschweig players
3. Liga players
Danish Superliga players
Danish 1st Division players
Danish expatriate men's footballers
Expatriate footballers in Norway
Expatriate footballers in Germany
Danish expatriate sportspeople in Norway
Danish expatriate sportspeople in Germany
Danish expatriate sportspeople in the United States
Næstved Boldklub players
People from Næstved Municipality
New York City FC players
Expatriate soccer players in the United States
Major League Soccer players
Sportspeople from Region Zealand